Gamereactor is a Scandinavian online media network covering video games in multiple languages and a former print magazines network. In 2013, it was "one of the biggest games publications in Europe" according to Develop.

History 
The Gamereactor website was started by Egmont Digital in 1998. Also in 1998, brothers Morten Reichel and Claus Reichel launched online and print magazine Gamez.dk in Denmark, which took over the online sites Gamereactor Denmark, Sweden and Norway (.dk/.se/.no) from Egmont in January 2002.

In 2001, they released Gamereactor Magazine in Norway and soon after in Sweden. Since late 2007 Gamereactor has also been available in Finland, and it also launched in Germany (Online only) in 2009. In 2010 they launched in Italy (Online only), and a Portuguese version came online in 2013. Gamereactor later opened outlets in France in November 2016, The Netherlands in January 2017, and China in January 2018.

On 1 September 2008, Gamereactor International was launched, an English edition of the website and the magazine (PDF). It features news, previews and reviews, with a special interest in the Nordic gaming industry, as well as video content from GRTV. The print magazine launched in the UK in 2013, and in 2017 Gamereactor launched a cross-network English language esports sub-site covering competitive gaming.

In November 2014, the print magazines were discontinued. It was free and distributed via game stores and electronics retailers in Denmark, Sweden, Finland, Norway, Germany and the UK. The magazine had eight issues every year (not in January or July), and was published in Danish, Norwegian, Swedish, German, English and Finnish.

The magazine has apps for iPhone and Android, PlayStation 4 and Xbox One consoles and Samsung's Smart TV Hub platform.

In 2004, Gamereactor Art Director Petter Hegevall was nominated by Sveriges Tidskrifter Swedish Design Awards. In 2013, Gamereactor Magazine (UK) was nominated in the best Print Magazine category at the Games Media Awards, and in 2015 the team were nominated in the Best Editorial Team (Print) category.

Controversy 
In June 2013, the magazine cover contained a The Last of Us artwork that was modified to remove the character Ellie. The editor posted a blog explaining it was a "pure design issue" and that they have previously modified artwork for covers.

Editors 
 Magnus Groth-Andersen - Danish Editor/Global Editor-in-chief
 Petter Hegevall - Swedish Editor/Art Director
 Jonas Mäki - Swedish Editor
 Silje Slette, Eirik Furu - Norwegian Editors
 Markus Hirsilä - Finnish Editor
 Mike Holmes - British/International Editor

External links
Gamereactor International — English website
Gamereactor Denmark — Danish website
Gamereactor Sweden — Swedish website
Gamereactor Norway — Norwegian website
Gamereactor Finland — Finnish website
Gamereactor Germany — German website
Gamereactor Italy — Italian website
Gamereactor Spain — Spanish website
Gamereactor Portugal — Portuguese website
Gamereactor France — French website
Gamereactor Netherlands — Dutch website
Gamereactor China — Chinese website
Gamereactor Poland — Polish website

References 

Video game magazines published in the United Kingdom
Video game magazines published in Denmark
Video game magazines published in Finland
Home computer magazines
Video game magazines published in Germany
Video game magazines published in Italy
Magazines established in 1998
Video game magazines published in Spain
Video game magazines published in Sweden
Eight times annually magazines
1998 establishments in Denmark